Fairmount Heights is a town in Prince George's County, Maryland, United States. 
Per the 2020 census, the population was 1,528. The town was formally incorporated in 1935, making the town the second oldest African-American-majority municipality in Prince George's County. The town is composed of six subdivisions: Fairmount Heights (1900), Waterford (1907), Mount Weissner (1909), North Fairmount Heights (1910), West Fairmount Heights (1911) and Sylvan Vista (1923).

History

Two Washington, D.C. land developers and lawyers, Allen Clark and Robinson White, platted the first subdivision of Fairmount Heights; separate developers platted the remaining five. Land speculators had purchased the farms that were previously in the area and consolidated the land for development. Clark and White sold the lots to African-Americans. Service on the Washington, Baltimore and Annapolis Electric Railway to the Gregory Station of nearby Seat Pleasant was established in 1908. Fairmount Heights incorporated in 1935 with all six subdivisions. The Fairmount Heights 
Historic District was added to the National Register of Historic Places in 2011.

Mayors
Robert S. Nichols   (1935–1937) 
Ulysses Mackall(1941–1943)
James A. Campbell   (1943–1955)
Doswell E. Brooks   (1955–1967)
Lawrence L. Brooks Sr.  (1967–1973) 
Charles C. Davis    (1973–1977)
Robert R. Gray      (1977–1991)
Ruth S. Brown       (1991–1993)
Jerome T. Countee   (1993–1997)
Kathleen T. Scott   (1997–1998)
R. Dean Cooks *      (1998–1999)
Johnnie R. Saxton   (1999–2003)
Lillie Thompson-Martin   (2003–2007)
Madeline E. Richardson   (2007–2009)
Nathaniel R. Mines Jr.  (2009–2011)
Lillie Thompson-Martin   (2011–2015)
Patricia M. Waiters (2015–2017)
Lillie Thompson-Martin   (2017–Present)

(*)- Served as acting mayor

Government
The Town Council of Fairmount Heights consists of six elected councilmembers and an elected mayor who sits as chair of the council. The mayor and councilmembers are elected to serve for two years. The following are current officers of the town:

Lillie Thompson-Martin Mayor, 2017
 Marshon S. Moreno, 2017
 Sherri Downing, 2017
 Jacqueline Wood-Dodson, 2016
 Elysha Saunders, 2016
 Dean Cook, 2016
 Patricia Ukkundo'Oohwaka, 2017

Prince George's County Police Department District 3 Station in Landover CDP serves the community.

Notable people

Prominent architect William Sidney Pittman built his home on Eastern Avenue; his wife, Portia, was the daughter of Booker T. Washington, founder of the Tuskegee Institute.

Historic sites
The following is a list of historic sites in Fairmount Heights identified by the Maryland-National Capital Park and Planning Commission.  On November 18, 2011, the Town of Fairmount Heights was added to the National Register of Historic Places as the Fairmont Heights Historic District.

Bordering areas
 Washington, D.C. (southwest)
 Seat Pleasant (southeast)
 Landover (northeast)
 Cheverly (north)

Geography
Fairmount Heights is located at  (38.901761, −76.914504).

Demographics

2020 census

Note: the US Census treats Hispanic/Latino as an ethnic category. This table excludes Latinos from the racial categories and assigns them to a separate category. Hispanics/Latinos can be of any race.

2010 census
As of the census of 2010, there were 1,494 people, 517 households, and 370 families residing in the town. The racial makeup of the town was 2.9% White, 88.6% African American, 0.4% Native American, 0.8% Asian, 5.3% from other races, and 1.9% from two or more races. Hispanic or Latino of any race were 8.1% of the population.

There were 517 households, of which 36.9% had children under the age of 18 living with them, 30.0% were married couples living together, 33.5% had a female householder with no husband present, 8.1% had a male householder with no wife present, and 28.4% were non-families. 24.2% of all households were made up of individuals, and 7.3% had someone living alone who was 65 years of age or older. The average household size was 2.88 and the average family size was 3.34.

The median age in the town was 37.3 years. 24.8% of residents were under the age of 18; 10.3% were between the ages of 18 and 24; 25.7% were from 25 to 44; 27.3% were from 45 to 64; and 12% were 65 years of age or older. The gender makeup of the town was 49.2% male and 50.8% female.

2000 census
As of the census of 2000, there were 1,508 people, 498 households, and 361 families residing in the town. The racial makeup of the town was 1.13% White, 95.82% African American, 0.27% Native American, 0.07% Asian, 0.60% from other races, and 2.12% from two or more races. Hispanic or Latino of any race were 1.13% of the population.

There were 498 households, out of which 29.7% had children under the age of 18 living with them, 36.9% were married couples living together, 26.7% had a female householder with no husband present, and 27.5% were non-families. 21.9% of all households were made up of individuals, and 8.4% had someone living alone who was 65 years of age or older. The average household size was 3.03 and the average family size was 3.52.

In the town, the population was spread out, with 29.0% under the age of 18, 7.6% from 18 to 24, 28.0% from 25 to 44, 24.0% from 45 to 64, and 11.4% who were 65 years of age or older. The median age was 36 years. For every 100 females, there were 89.9 males. For every 100 females age 18 and over, there were 90.2 males.

The median income for a household in the town was $48,250, and the median income for a family was $53,304. Males had a median income of $34,107 versus $34,327 for females. The per capita income for the town was $17,966. About 6.9% of families and 9.3% of the population were below the poverty line, including 11.3% of those under age 18 and 4.0% of those age 65 or over.

Education
Fairmount Heights is a part of the Prince George's County Public Schools system.

Zoned elementary schools for town are Robert Gray and Seat Pleasant. All residents are zoned to G. James Gholson Middle School and Fairmont Heights High School.

Originally Charity Hall housed the school in Fairmount Heights. The previous Fairmount Heights Elementary School building, in the hip-frame style and two stories tall, is used as a church. Designed by W. Sidney Pittman, who headed the committee for the building's construction, the building opened in June 1912. Residents asked the county government for one in the beginning of 1911, and in April of that year the county board asked for the establishment of the school. The Mount Zion Apostolic Faith Church purchased the building in 1934; at that time a brick school building on Addison Road, with eight classrooms, became the new school building.

Transportation

The main road through Fairmount Heights is Addison Road. Other significant roads include Eastern Avenue, which forms the southwest border of town (adjacent to Washington, D.C.), and Sheriff Road, which forms the northwest and north border of the town. No state highways enter Fairmount Heights. The closest state highway is Maryland Route 704 in adjacent Seat Pleasant.

References
 Historic Fairmount Heights . Maryland-National Capital Park and Planning Commission and the Prince George's County Planning Department, December 2013. PDF link. Also available on Issuu.

Reference list

External links

 Town of Fairmount Heights official website

Towns in Maryland
Towns in Prince George's County, Maryland
Washington metropolitan area
Historic districts on the National Register of Historic Places in Maryland
National Register of Historic Places in Prince George's County, Maryland
Populated places established in 1935
1935 establishments in Maryland